Durrow may refer to the following locations in the Republic of Ireland.
 Durrow, County Offaly, a village in County Offaly.
 Durrow, County Laois, a town in County Laois.
 Durrow, County Kilkenny, a civil parish in the barony of Galmoy, Co. Kilkenny; transferred to Queen's County (Laois) in the 1840s.
 Durrow, County Westmeath a civil parish in County Westmeath.